Breaking the Silence is a 2000 Chinese film directed by Sun Zhou. It was China's submission to the 73rd Academy Awards for the Academy Award for Best Foreign Language Film, but was not accepted as a nominee.

Breaking the Silence stars the internationally known Gong Li as a single mother who struggles to raise her deaf child. The film premiered internationally at the 2000 Berlin International Film Festival.

The film was one of three films voted Best Picture in the 2001 Hundred Flowers Awards.

See also

 List of submissions to the 73rd Academy Awards for Best Foreign Language Film
 List of Chinese submissions for the Academy Award for Best Foreign Language Film

References

External links

Breaking the Silence from the Chinese Movie Database

2000 films
2000 drama films
2000s Mandarin-language films
Films set in Beijing
Chinese drama films
Films directed by Sun Zhou
2000s Chinese films